Batrachedra decoctor is a species of moth of the family Batrachedridae. It is native to the southeastern United States, especially northern Florida.

Ecology
In its larval state it feeds exclusively on saw palmetto (Serenoa repens).

Subspecies
Batrachedra decoctor decoctor
Batrachedra decoctor bermudensis Hodges, 1966 (Bermuda)

References

Moths of North America
Batrachedridae
Moths described in 1966